Ronald Allen Middleton (born July 17, 1965) is an American football coach and  former player who is the tight ends coach for the New York Jets of the National Football League (NFL).  Middeton played professionally as a tight end for the Atlanta Falcons and the Washington Redskins of the NFL. He played college football at Auburn University. He played on the Escambia County High School "Blue" Devils football team in Atmore, Alabama.  Middeton has coached for Troy Trojans, the Ole Miss Rebels, the Tampa Bay Buccaneers, and the Alabama Crimson Tide.

Playing career
Ron was a tight end out of Auburn where he won three bowl games. He entered the NFL as an undrafted free agent and played for the Atlanta, Washington, Cleveland, Los Angeles Rams and San Diego.

Coaching career
After eight years with the Jacksonville Jaguars as a tight end/special teams coach, Middleton joined Robert Saleh on his New York Jets coaching staff as  tight ends coach in 2021. In Week 16 of the 2021 season, Middleton served as the acting Head Coach of the New York Jets after Saleh tested positive for COVID-19. The Jets won over the Jacksonville Jaguars 26-21 on December 26. He also was the head coach at the 2022 Senior Bowl for the National Team when the Jets were chosen to be one of the coaching staffs for the game.

External links
 Jacksonville Jaguars profile
 Duke profile

1965 births
Living people
American football tight ends
Alabama Crimson Tide football coaches
Atlanta Falcons players
Auburn Tigers football players
Cleveland Browns players
Duke Blue Devils football coaches
Jacksonville Jaguars coaches
Los Angeles Rams players
Ole Miss Rebels football coaches
San Diego Chargers players
Tampa Bay Buccaneers coaches
Troy Trojans football coaches
Washington Redskins players
People from Atmore, Alabama
Players of American football from Alabama
African-American coaches of American football
African-American players of American football
21st-century African-American people
20th-century African-American sportspeople
New York Jets coaches